June E. O'Neill  is an American economist who was the director of the United States Congressional Budget Office (CBO) from March 1, 1995, through January 29, 1999. She was born to Louis and Matilda (Liebstein) Ellenoff on June 14, 1934, and attended Sara Lawrence College, graduating in 1955. Prior to receiving her PhD from Columbia University, she taught at Temple University. Later, she worked at the Council of Economic Advisors as a senior economist, a research associate at the Urban Institute and the Brookings Institution, served as director of the office of policy and research for the United States Commission on Civil Rights, and both before and after her time as director of the CBO, as director of the Center for Study Business and Government at Baruch College, where she is currently the Morton Wollman Professor of Economics.

She was nominated to her post at the CBO at the suggestion of then Republican congressman John Kasich, but her term as CBO director ended early to return to Baruch college amid Republican complaints that the CBO refused to use the more favorable but controversial dynamic scoring for forecasting and scoring republican-proposed legislation. She was later commended by the Senate for her service.

She has published extensively in economics, served as the Vice President of the American Economic Association in 1998, and was on their Executive Board of the Committee on the Status of Women in the Economics Profession from 1988 until 1991. She currently serves on the board of directors of the Committee for a Responsible Federal Budget.

Bibliography

References

External links
Home page at the National Bureau of Economic Research

Directors of the Congressional Budget Office
Columbia University alumni
Sarah Lawrence College alumni
Living people
1934 births